The 2004–05 season was the 90th in the history of the Isthmian League, which is an English football competition featuring semi-professional and amateur clubs from London, East and South East England.

Also, it was the first season after the creation of the Conference North and South, one step above the Isthmian League. Therefore, it was the inaugural season for the league at the seventh, eighth and ninth tiers in the English league system.

Premier Division

After the creation of the Conference North and South, placed above the Isthmian League before the start of the season most of the Premier Division clubs were transferred to the newly created divisions.

The Premier Division featured seven clubs from the previous season and 15 new clubs:
 Seven clubs remained in the league:
 Billericay Town
 Braintree Town
 Harrow Borough
 Hendon
 Heybridge Swifts
 Kingstonian
 Northwood
 Four clubs transferred from Division One North:
 Cheshunt
 Leyton
 Wealdstone
 Yeading
 Five clubs transferred from Division One South:
 Hampton & Richmond Borough
 Slough Town
 Staines Town
 Windsor & Eton
 Worthing
 Two clubs transferred from the Southern Football League Premier Division:
 Chelmsford City
 Dover Athletic
 Four clubs transferred from Southern Football League Eastern Division:
 Eastleigh
 Folkestone Invicta
 Salisbury City
 Tonbridge Angels

Yeading won the division and were promoted to the Conference South along with play-off winners Eastleigh. Tonbridge Angels, Dover Athletic and Kingstonian finished bottom of the table and were relegated to Division One, while 19th-placed Cheshunt were reprieved as the club with a better record than the equivalent Northern Premier League and Southern League clubs after Conference South side Hornchurch folded.

League table

Play-offs

Stadia and locations

Division One

After the creation of the Conference North and South one step above the Isthmian League, most of the Premier Division clubs were transferred to the newly created divisions. Consequently, the best Division One clubs took up the empty spots in higher divisions. Remaining Division One North clubs were transferred to the Southern Football League. Two Isthmian League Division One sections were merged into single Division One.

Division One consisted of 13 clubs transferred from Division One South and nine new clubs:
 13 clubs transferred from Division One South:
 Banstead Athletic
 Bromley
 Corinthian Casuals
 Croydon
 Croydon Athletic
 Dulwich Hamlet
 Horsham
 Leatherhead
 Metropolitan Police
 Molesey
 Tooting & Mitcham United
 Walton & Hersham
 Whyteleafe
 Six clubs transferred from Southern Football League Eastern Division:
 Ashford Town (Kent)
 Bashley
 Burgess Hill Town
 Fleet Town
 Hastings United
 Newport (Isle of Wight)
 Plus:
 Dorking, promoted from Division Two
 AFC Wimbledon, promoted from the Combined Counties League
 Cray Wanderers, promoted from the Kent League

AFC Wimbledon won the division to earn a second promotion in a row along with runners-up Walton & Hersham and play-off winners Bromley. Dorking returned to Division Two along with Croydon.

League table

Play-offs

Stadia and locations

Division Two

Division Two consisted of 16 clubs, including 12 clubs from the previous season, and four new clubs:
 Brook House, transferred from the Spartan South Midlands League
 Enfield, relegated from Division One North
 Epsom & Ewell, relegated from Division One South
 Ilford, joined from the Essex Senior League

Ilford won the division and were promoted to Southern League Eastern Division along with runners-up Enfield. There was no relegation from Division Two, though Abingdon Town resigned from the league at the end of the season.

League table

Stadia and locations

League Cup

The Isthmian League Cup 2004–05 was the 31st season of the Isthmian League Cup, the league cup competition of the Isthmian League. Sixty clubs took part. The competition commenced on 26 October 2004 and finished on 28 April 2005.

Calendar

Fixtures and results
Fixtures are listed in alphabetical order, not that which they were drawn in.

First round
In the First round, the thirty-six lowest ranked clubs in the Isthmian League played each other for a place in the Second round.

Second round
The eighteen clubs to have made it through the First round were entered into the Second round draw with Fleet Town and Whyteleafe, making twenty teams.

Third round
The ten clubs to have made it through the Second round were entered into the Third round draw with the twenty-two Premier Division clubs, making thirty-two teams.

Fourth round

Quarterfinals

Semifinals
The Semifinals fixtures were played over two legs.

Final

The only red card of the match came for Hampton & Richmond Borough's Dean Wells. There was also a yellow card for Slough Town's Josias Carbon.

See also
Isthmian League
2004–05 Northern Premier League
2004–05 Southern Football League

References

External links
Official website

Isthmian League seasons
7